Rashida Harbi Tlaib (born July 24, 1976) is an American politician and lawyer serving as the U.S. representative for  since 2019 (known as the 13th congressional district until 2023). The district includes the western half of Detroit, along with several of its western suburbs and much of the Downriver area. A member of the Democratic Party, Tlaib represented the 6th and 12th districts of the Michigan House of Representatives before her election to Congress.

In 2018, Tlaib won the Democratic nomination for the United States House of Representatives seat from Michigan's 13th congressional district. She ran unopposed in the general election and became the first woman of Palestinian descent in Congress, the first Muslim woman to serve in the Michigan legislature, and one of the first two Muslim women elected to Congress, along with Ilhan Omar (D-MN). Tlaib is a member of The Squad, an informal group of six (four until the 2020 elections) U.S. representatives on the left wing of the Democratic Party.

Tlaib and Alexandria Ocasio-Cortez (D-NY) were the first female members of Democratic Socialists of America to serve in Congress. Tlaib has argued in favor of abolishing the U.S. Immigration and Customs Enforcement. She was a vocal critic of the Trump administration and advocated for Trump's impeachment. On foreign affairs, she has sharply criticized the Israeli government, called for an end to U.S. aid to Israel, supports a one-state solution, and supports the Boycott, Divestment and Sanctions campaign.

Early life and education 
The eldest of 14 children, Rashida Harbi was born on July 24, 1976, to working-class Palestinian immigrants in Detroit. Her mother was born in Beit Ur El Foka, near the West Bank city of Ramallah. The name Rashida means "righteous". Her father was born in Beit Hanina, a neighborhood in East Jerusalem. He moved first to Nicaragua, then to Detroit. He worked on an assembly line in a Ford Motor Company plant. As the eldest, Tlaib played a role in raising her siblings while her parents worked.

Tlaib attended elementary school at Harms, Bennett Elementary, and Phoenix Academy. She graduated from Southwestern High School in Detroit in 1994. Tlaib received a Bachelor of Arts degree in political science from Wayne State University in 1998 and her Juris Doctor from Thomas M. Cooley Law School in 2004. Tlaib was admitted to the bar in 2007.

Michigan House of Representatives 

Tlaib began her political career in 2004 when she interned with State Representative Steve Tobocman. When Tobocman became Majority Floor Leader in 2007, he hired Tlaib to his staff.
In 2008 Tobocman encouraged Tlaib to run for his seat, which he was vacating due to term limits. The urban district is 40% Hispanic, 25% African-American, 30% non-Hispanic white Americans, and 2% Arab American. Tlaib faced a crowded primary that included several Latinos, including former State Representative Belda Garza. She emerged victorious, carrying 44% of the vote in the eight-way Democratic primary and winning the general election with over 90% of the vote.

In 2010, Tlaib faced a primary election challenge from Jim Czachorowski in his first bid for office. Tlaib picked up 85% of the vote to Czachorowski's 15%, and won the general election with 92% of the vote against Republican challenger Darrin Daigle.

In 2012, Tlaib won reelection again to the Michigan House in the newly redrawn 6th district against fellow incumbent Maureen Stapleton. She could not run for the Michigan House a fourth time in 2014 because of term limits and ran for the Michigan Senate, losing to incumbent Senator Virgil Smith Jr. in the Democratic primary in August 2014.

During her tenure as a legislator, Tlaib was one of ten Muslims serving in state legislatures across the United States. She is the second Muslim to serve in the Michigan State House of Representatives, after James Karoub. Tlaib is the second Muslim woman to serve in a state legislature nationwide, after Jamilah Nasheed of Missouri. She and Justin Amash, a Republican who was also elected in 2008, were the first two Palestinian-American members of the Michigan legislature.

After leaving the state legislature, Tlaib worked at Sugar Law Center, a Detroit nonprofit that provides free legal representation for workers.

U.S. House of Representatives

Elections

2018 special 

In 2018, Tlaib announced her intention to run for the 13th congressional district. Conyers had resigned in December 2017 due to a sexual harassment scandal, and the seat had been vacant since then. She filed in both the Democratic primary in the special election for the balance of Conyers's 27th term and in the general election for a full two-year term. No Republican qualified for either election, though any Republican challenger would have faced nearly impossible odds. The 13th is the most Democratic district in Michigan, with a Cook Partisan Voting Index of D+32. Conyers had held the seat and its predecessors since 1965 (it had been numbered as the 1st District from 1965 to 1993 and as the 14th from 1993 to 2013), and had never tallied less than 77 percent of the vote.

As of July 16, 2018, Tlaib had raised $893,030 in funds, more than her five opponents in the August 7 Democratic primary. Tlaib, as a member of the Justice Democrats, made a guest appearance on the political interview show Rebel HQ of the progressive media network The Young Turks (TYT).

In the Democratic primary for the special election, Tlaib finished second to Detroit City Council president Brenda Jones, who received 32,727 votes (37.7% of the total) to Tlaib's 31,084 (35.9%). Bill Wild, mayor of Westland, received 13,152 votes (15.2%) and Ian Conyers, the great-nephew of former Congressman Conyers, took fourth with 9,740 (11.2%).

2018 general 

In the Democratic primary for the general election, Tlaib defeated Jones and Wild, among others. She received 27,803 votes, or 31.2%. She faced no major-party opposition in November 2018, though Jones mounted an eleventh-hour write-in bid.

Tlaib became the first Palestinian-American woman to be elected to Congress and simultaneously one of the first two Muslim women in Congress, along with fellow Democrat Ilhan Omar of Minnesota. She took the congressional oath of office on January 3, 2019, swearing in on an English-language translation of the Quran. She wore a thawb (thobe), a traditional embroidered Arab dress, to the swearing-in ceremony. This inspired a number of Palestinian and Palestinian-American women to share pictures on social media with the hashtag #TweetYourThobe.

2020 

Jones challenged Tlaib in the 2020 Democratic primary. Tlaib won, 66%–34%, spending over $2,000,000 in campaign funds to Jones's $140,000.

Tenure

House Ethics Committee investigation 
On November 14, 2019, the House Ethics Committee announced that it was investigating whether Tlaib used congressional campaign money for personal expenses in violation of House rules. In August 2020 the committee directed Tlaib to reimburse her campaign $10,800, stating that Tlaib has an "obligation to act in accordance with the strict technical requirements of federal campaign laws and regulations, including the restrictions on personal use of campaign funds".

Committee assignments 
 Committee on Financial Services
 Subcommittee on Diversity and Inclusion
 Subcommittee on Oversight and Investigations
 Committee on Natural Resources
 Subcommittee on National Parks, Forests and Public Lands
 Committee on Oversight and Reform
 Subcommittee on Civil Rights and Civil Liberties
 Subcommittee on Environment

Caucus memberships 
 Congressional Progressive Caucus
 Congressional Freethought Caucus

Political positions

Israeli–Palestinian conflict 
Tlaib has said she opposed providing aid to a "Netanyahu Israel" and supported the Palestinian right of return and a one-state solution. In 2018, J Street withdrew its endorsement of Tlaib due to her support for a one-state solution. J Street stated that she had misled it about her views on the issue during her primary campaign. Responding to criticism, Tlaib elaborated by saying that she believed a two-state solution under Benjamin Netanyahu's government was not possible without harming the Israeli people. Tlaib is one of the few members of Congress to openly support the Boycott, Divestment and Sanctions (BDS) movement against the Israeli government. She has defended her support of the boycott on free speech grounds and as a response to Israel's military occupation of the West Bank and settlement building, which the international community considers illegal under international law, though Israel disputes this.

In January 2019, Tlaib criticized anti-BDS legislation proposed by Senators Marco Rubio and Jim Risch. She argued that boycotting is a right and that Rubio and Risch "forgot what country they represent". Tlaib's comments were criticized by several groups, including the Anti-Defamation League, which said, "Though the legislation discussed is sponsored by four non-Jewish Senators, any charge of dual loyalty has special sensitivity and resonance for Jews, particularly in an environment of rising anti-Semitism." Tlaib responded that her comments were directed at Rubio and Risch, not the Jewish American community. She was one of 17 members of Congress to vote against a July 2019 House resolution condemning the BDS movement, which passed by a margin of 381 votes. Tlaib suggested boycotting HBO host Bill Maher after he denounced the BDS movement.

In March 2020, Tlaib spoke at a gala for American Muslims for Palestine, a group that supports an end to the Israeli occupation of the West Bank, equality for Arab Israelis, and a right of return for Palestinian refugees. The Anti-Defamation League has argued that the group holds extreme anti-Israel views and provides a cover for antisemitism; AMP denies this and states that it opposes antisemitism.

In December 2020, Tlaib deleted a retweet she had posted a few days earlier, on the International Day of Solidarity with the Palestinian People, containing the phrase "From the River to the Sea"a nationalist Palestinian slogan associated with calls for Israel's elimination in the past.

On September 23, 2021, Tlaib called Israel an "apartheid state" on the House floor during a debate over funding for Iron Dome; Representative Ted Deutch responded by accusing Tlaib of antisemitism.

Ban from entering Israel 
On August 15, 2019, Israel announced that Tlaib and her colleague Ilhan Omar would be denied entry into the country. According to The Times of Israel, Deputy Israeli Foreign Minister Tzipi Hotovely said Israel would not "allow those who deny our right to exist in this world to enter" and called it a "very justified decision." It was reported that President Trump had pressed the government of Benjamin Netanyahu to make such a decision. The next day, Israeli authorities granted a request by Tlaib to visit her relatives in the Israeli-occupied West Bank on humanitarian grounds and under certain restrictions on political statements. Tlaib declined to go, saying that she did not want to make the trip "under these oppressive conditions." The Israeli interior ministry stated that Tlaib had previously agreed to abide by any rules their government had set in exchange for being permitted to visit the country, and accused her of making a "provocative request aimed at bashing the State of Israel".

In August 2019, following the decision of Israel to ban them from arriving in the country, Tlaib and Ilhan Omar retweeted a cartoon by Carlos Latuff, whose cartoons has been accused of using anti-Semitic tropes. Representative Jerry Nadler, The Anti-Defamation League, and other Jewish groups condemned them for sharing it.

Saudi Arabia 
Tlaib has criticized Saudi Arabia's human rights violations and the Saudi Arabian-led intervention in Yemen.

Trump administration 
Tlaib supported the efforts to impeach President Trump. In August 2016, she protested a speech then-candidate Trump gave at Cobo Center and was ejected from the venue. On her first day in Congress, January 3, 2019, she published an op-ed with John Bonifaz in which she argued that it was not necessary to wait for Special Counsel Robert Mueller to complete his criminal investigation before proceeding with impeachment.

Later that day, Tlaib spoke at a reception for the MoveOn campaign, recounting a conversation with her son in which she expressed her resolve to "impeach the motherfucker". Trump retorted that her comments were "highly disrespectful to the United States of America".

In a radio interview with Mehdi Hasan of The Intercept, Tlaib reiterated her call for Trump's impeachment.

Drug law reform 
Tlaib supports ending the federal prohibition of cannabis and "releasing people convicted of marijuana-related offenses".

Democratic Party 
Tlaib, a member of the Democratic Socialists of America, aligns politically with the left wing of the Democratic Party.

Domestic policy 
She supports domestic reforms, including Medicare for All and a $18 to $20 hourly minimum wage. On November 5, 2021, Tlaib was one of six House Democrats to break with their party and vote against the Infrastructure Investment and Jobs Act because it was decoupled from the social safety net provisions in the Build Back Better Act.

Immigration 
Tlaib was an early supporter of the movement to abolish the Immigration Customs Enforcement agency. In June 2019 she was one of four Democratic representatives to vote against the Emergency Supplemental Appropriations for Humanitarian Assistance and Security at the Southern Border Act, a $4.5 billion border funding bill that required Customs and Border Protection enact health standards for individuals in custody such as forming standards for individuals for "medical emergencies; nutrition, hygiene, and facilities; and personnel training."

Law enforcement 
Following the killing of Daunte Wright, Tlaib called American policing "inherently and intentionally racist", saying, "No more policing, incarceration, and militarization. It can't be reformed." Detroit police chief James Craig called Tlaib's comments "disgusting".

Abortion 
Tlaib supports abortion rights and has criticized what she called "white men trying to force women to not have the right to seek legal abortions". She was endorsed by abortion rights organization NARAL.

Syria 
In 2023, Tlaib was among 56 Democrats to vote in favor of H.Con.Res. 21 which directed President Joe Biden to remove U.S. troops from Syria within 180 days.

Personal life 
In 1998, at the age of 22, Tlaib married Fayez Tlaib. They have two sons, Adam and Yousif. The couple have since divorced. In 2018 a campaign spokesperson referred to Tlaib as a single mother.

In September 2018, The New York Times reported that Tlaib walked into her family's mosque to express her gratitude for the opportunity to run for Congress, articulating a belief that "my Allah is She". The Detroit Free Press reported that, although she recognizes that some in her faith community consider her not "Muslim enough", she believes that Allah understands that she deems her actions "reflective of Islam".

Electoral history

See also 
 List of Arab and Middle Eastern Americans in the United States Congress
 List of Democratic Socialists of America who have held office in the United States
 List of Muslim members of the United States Congress
 The Squad (United States Congress)
 Women in the United States House of Representatives

References

Further reading 
Palestinian-American Democrat: I Will 'Humanize' the Palestinian People in the U.S. Congress

External links 

Congresswoman Rashida Tlaib official U.S. House website
Campaign website

|-

|-

1976 births
Living people
American Muslims
American politicians of Palestinian descent
American women lawyers
Democratic Party members of the United States House of Representatives from Michigan
Female members of the United States House of Representatives
Left-wing populism in the United States
Democratic Socialists of America politicians from Michigan
Democratic Party members of the Michigan House of Representatives
Michigan lawyers
Muslim members of the United States House of Representatives
Muslim socialists
Politicians from Detroit
Progressivism in the United States
Western Michigan University Cooley Law School alumni
Wayne State University alumni
Women state legislators in Michigan
21st-century American women politicians
21st-century American women lawyers
21st-century American lawyers